Anya Chalotra (born July 1995) is a British actress primarily known for her role as Yennefer of Vengerberg in the Netflix original series The Witcher. She is also known for appearing in Wanderlust.

Early life 
Chalotra was born in Wolverhampton, England, to an Indian father and English mother. She grew up in the village of Lower Penn, in South Staffordshire, where she lived with her parents and two siblings, an elder sister Reeya and a younger brother Arun. Chalotra completed her schooling at the St Dominic's Grammar School in Brewood and later completed the one-year foundation course at the London Academy of Music and Dramatic Art before training for three years at the Guildhall School of Music and Drama.

Career 
Chalotra has starred in several stage productions, including Much Ado About Nothing until 15 October 2017 and The Village until 6 October 2018.

Chalotra currently stars in a main role as Yennefer of Vengerberg in the Netflix fantasy drama The Witcher. She has featured in both seasons released to date; the first season premiered on 20 December 2019, with the second following on December 17, 2021.

Chalotra was listed as one of Screen Daily's Stars of Tomorrow 2020.

On 15 July 2020, it was announced that Chalotra would be headlining the voice cast of a sci-fi animation series NEW-GEN.

On 30 September 2020, Chalotra starred in a television short film special called No Masks that aired on Sky Arts. The special is based on real-life testimonies of key frontline workers in East London during the COVID-19 pandemic.

First released on 26 December 2020, Chalotra voiced Sabrina in BBC Sounds sci-fi podcast The Cipher.

Filmography

Theatre

Podcast

Awards and nominations

References

External links

 

1990s births
Living people
English television actresses
Actresses from London
21st-century English actresses
British Shakespearean actresses
English stage actresses
English people of Indian descent
British actresses of Indian descent
Alumni of the London Academy of Music and Dramatic Art
Alumni of the Guildhall School of Music and Drama
People educated at St Dominic's Grammar School